Nodozana fifina is a moth of the subfamily Arctiinae. It was described by Paul Dognin in 1913. It is found in Panama.

References

Lithosiini
Moths described in 1913